The Earth Observing System (EOS) is a program of NASA comprising a series of artificial satellite missions and scientific instruments in Earth orbit designed for long-term global observations of the land surface, biosphere, atmosphere, and oceans. Since the early 1970s, NASA has been developing its Earth Observing System, launching a series of Landsat satellites in the decade. Some of the first included passive microwave imaging in 1972 through the Nimbus 5 satellite. Following the launch of various satellite missions, the conception of the program began in the late 1980s and expanded rapidly through the 1990s. Since the inception of the program, it has continued to develop, including; land, sea, radiation and atmosphere. Collected in a system known as EOSDIS, NASA uses this data in order to study the progression and changes in the biosphere of Earth. The main focus of this data collection surrounds climatic science. The program is the centrepiece of NASA's Earth Science Enterprise.

History and development 

Prior to the development of the current Earth Observing System (EOS), the foundations for this program were laid in the early 1960s and 1970s. TIROS-1, the very first full-scale, low Earth orbit weather satellite. The primary objective of TIROS-1 was to explore television infrared observation as a method of monitoring and studying the surface of Earth. Critical to the development of the satellites currently in use, TIROS-1 was a program that allowed NASA to use experimental instruments and data collection methods to study meteorology worldwide. Crucially, this new information gathered by TIROS-1 would allow meteorologists and scientists to observe large-scale weather events. In doing so, they would be able to answer questions such as  "should we evacuate the coast because of the hurricane?". Following TIROS, the experimental Applications Technology Satellite (ATS) program was developed. The main objective of these satellites were weather predictions and the study of the environment of space. Significantly, this program focused on launching satellites to orbit geosynchronously and evaluate the effectiveness of this orbit pattern in observing the Earth. ATS-3, the longest-lasting mission, saw a life span of over 20 years. It was the first satellite to capture colour images from space and acted significantly as a medium of communications.

After the success of TIROS-1 and ATS-3, NASA in conjunction with United States Geological Survey (USGS), progressed forward in Earth observation through a series of Landsat satellites launched throughout the 1970s and 1980s. The Nimbus 5 satellite launched in 1972 used passive microwave imaging; a highly successful method to observe changes in sea ice cover.  Observation was furthered by succeeding missions such as Nimbus 7, fitted with a coastal zone colour scanner (CZCS) for detailing colour changes in the Earth's oceans, and a Total Ozone Mapping Spectrometer (TOMS) to measure solar irradiance and the reflected radiance from the Earth's atmosphere. The early satellites of these programs have paved the way for much of the EOS program today. The TIROS satellites were extremely important in the testing and development of not only the Earth observing instruments such as spectrometers, but much was also learnt from the various sensors used in order to maintain these satellites in orbit for sustainable periods of time. Sensors such as horizons sensors were tested on these early satellites and have been adapted to produce more advanced methods of observation and operating configurations.

Operation and technology - Logistics

Data collection and uses 
Since the inception of the program, the aim overall has remained the same: "monitor and understand key components of the climate system and their interactions through long-term global observations." Through the use of various programs such as LandSat and the A-Train programs, scientists are gaining a greater understanding of Earth and its changes. Currently, the data collected by the satellites in EOS is digitised and collated by the Earth Observing System Data and Information System. Scientists then use this data to predict weather events, and more recently to predict the effects of climate change for treaties such as Paris Climate agreements, with data mainly being collected by EOS and then analysed.

Intergovernmental agencies and partnerships 
In a broader sense of earth observing and all missions that impact EOS, there have been a variety of intergovernmental partnerships and international partnerships that have helped fund, research and develop the complex array of satellites and spacecraft that make the Earth Observing System successful in its role. In total, intergovernmental partnerships account for almost 37% of all missions while 27% of the missions also involve international partnerships with other countries and international companies.

As of 2022, there have been nine LandSat satellites with LandSat 7, 8, and 9 orbiting the earth. The LandSat program has involved many organisations since its inception, particularly the United States Geological Survey (USGS). Other intergovernmental agencies that have been a part of the Earth Observing program include the Environmental Science Services Administration (ESSA), US Department of Defence (USDOD), United States Department of Energy (USDOE) and the US National Oceanic and Atmospheric Administration (NOAA). These intergovernmental agencies cooperating allow for greater funding for the program along with collaboration of government resources from various agencies. Often these partnerships begin with another governmental agency wanting a specific instrument as a part of a payload included on a mission.

Similarly, international partnerships with countries have either resulted from a specific payload (instrument) accompanying an existing mission that NASA has developed or NASA collaborating and requiring the use of facilities of another Space agency such as the European Space Agency. A partnership like this was observed in 2000 when the ERS-1 satellite was launched from the Guiana Space Centre; a spaceport in French Guiana, South America. International agencies that have assisted or collaborated with NASA include CONAE (Argentinian Space Agency), CNES (French Space Agency), DLR (German Aerospace Centre), the state space federation Roscosmos of the Russian Federation, and JAXA (Japanese Space Agency; previously NASDA).

Over the program's life, there have also been various corporate and organisational partnerships with companies both based in America and internationally. In 2002, the SeaWIFS missions saw a collaboration with GEOeye, an American satellite imaging company. Similarly, organisations such as the International Council for Science (ICSU), International standards Organisation (IOS), World Data System (WDS) and the committee on Earth Observing Satellites (CEOS) have been involved in the planning, data collection, and data analysis of missions. As mentioned, funding, instrumental additions and over assistance in coordination and data analysis are all benefits of these partnerships.

Mission list with launch dates

Future missions

Sentinel 6B 
As the Earth Observing System becomes more crucial in studying the Earth's climate and changes, the program will continue to evolve. NASA along with other government agencies such as the European Space Agency and NASDA (Japan), have planned many future missions. Sentinel 6B is one such mission with the aim of continued water and ocean observations. A key objective of the sentinel missions is to monitor sea level rise, a primary indicator of climate change and global warming. As Paris Agreement policy and more countries aim for a carbon neutral world, the data collected by Sentinel missions will assist in the continued understanding of the Earth's changing climate. It is also expected that one of the sentinel satellites will test a new experiment with regards to weather prediction. As a part of its payload, it will use Global Navigation Satellite System Radio Occultation (GNSS-RO), a method to detail changes and information of different layers in the atmosphere.

JPSS-3 and 4 
JPSS or Joint Polar Satellite systems are expected to launch in 2027. This project will be an  intergovernmental collaboration between NASA and National Oceanic and Atmospheric Administration (NOAA) and will observe a new generation of Polar Orbiting environmental satellites. Crucially, these polar orbiting satellites are non-geosynchronous meaning these two satellites will have an inclination angle of close to 90 degrees to the equator. Crucially this project is continuing and is the third and fourth satellite in the JPSS series. The payload for this type of satellite will include Visible Infrared imaging Radiometer, Advanced Technology Microwave Sounder and Ozone Mapping and Profiler Suite. The data collected by these variety of instruments will included numerical weather prediction to be used for modelling and forecast prediction.

EVM-3 INCUS 

A branch of the Earth Venture Missions, the Investigation of Convective Updrafts missions is planned to have three small satellites. The three satellites will orbit in tight coordination and will have the aim of understanding the formation of convective storms and heavy precipitation. It aims to know not only how, but know exactly where and when they will form. Although still in planning and development stages, the first of the three satellites in EVM-3 in 2027. After deliberation between 12 proposals of EVM in 2021, the INCUS mission was selected after a review by panellists. NASA's Earth Science Director Karen St. Germain stated, "In a changing climate, more accurate information about how storms develop and intensify can help improve weather models and our ability to predict risk of extreme weather." As the effects of climate change are ever more increasing with increasing sea level temperatures globally, it is predicted that storms will have a greater intensity and occur more often. This is a result of increased water vapour moving upwards creating the convection currents. INCUS will help scientist understand these currents and help predict the likelihood and location of major storms when fully operational.

Key personnel

See also
 A-train (satellite constellation)
 Atmospheric Chemistry Observational Databases
 Earth observation satellite
 Earth Observing System Data and Information System (EOSDIS) – provides end-to-end capabilities for managing NASA's Earth science data
 Geoinformatics
 List of Earth observation satellites

References

External links
Algorithm Theoretical Basis Documents
EOS Homepage at NASA

NASA programs
Earth observation satellites
Articles containing video clips
Satellite series
NASA satellites orbiting Earth
Earth observation satellites of the United States
Remote sensing programs